Bak (also Romanized as Baq; also known as Bakeh, Beik, and Beyk) is a village in Jolgeh-e Mazhan Rural District, Jolgeh-e Mazhan District, Khusf County, South Khorasan Province, Iran. At the 2006 census, its population was 20, in 5 families.

References 

Populated places in Khusf County